The  Arizona Rattlers season was the 21st season for the franchise in the Arena Football League. The team was coached by Kevin Guy and played their home games at US Airways Center. After winning their third consecutive division championship with a 13–5 record, the Rattlers were able to advance to ArenaBowl XXV, where they defeated the Philadelphia Soul 72–54 to win their third league championship in franchise history.

Final roster

Standings

Schedule

Regular season
The Rattlers began the season on the road against the San Jose SaberCats on March 10. Their first home game was on March 17 when they played the Milwaukee Mustangs. They hosted the Kansas City Command in their final regular season game on July 21.

Playoffs

References

Arizona Rattlers
Arizona Rattlers seasons
Arizona Rattlers
2010s in Phoenix, Arizona
ArenaBowl champion seasons